Hendrik Christiaan "Hein" van Suylekom (17 March 1904 – 11 December 1982) was a Dutch rower. Together with Carel van Wankum he won three bronze medals at the European championships of 1925–1927. The pair competed at the 1928 Summer Olympics, but failed to reach the final. Twenty years later, aged 44, van Suylekom competed at the 1948 Games in the coxless fours event, but his team was again eliminated in a preliminary round.

References

1904 births
1982 deaths
Dutch male rowers
Olympic rowers of the Netherlands
Rowers at the 1928 Summer Olympics
Rowers at the 1948 Summer Olympics
Sportspeople from Rotterdam
European Rowing Championships medalists